Ewa Podleś (born April 26, 1952) is a Polish coloratura contralto singer who has had an active international career both on the opera stage and in recital. She is known for the agility of her voice and a vocal range which spans more than three octaves.

Life and career
Podleś was born in Warsaw, Poland, and after studying at the Warsaw Academy of Music under  Alina Bolechowska, made her stage debut as Rosina in Rossini's The Barber of Seville in 1975. She made her Metropolitan Opera debut on February 14, 1984, singing the title role in Handel's Rinaldo, but only for a few performances that year (from which only two were in the Met's house), and was notably absent from the Met for more than 24 years, since then pursuing her career elsewhere and performing regularly at many other opera houses in Europe and America. In 1996, she sang the part of the Marquise de Berkenfeld in Donizetti's La fille du régiment at La Scala, a performance which has been preserved on DVD.  Her return to the Met took place on September 24, 2008, when she sang the role of La Cieca in Ponchielli's La Gioconda.

Though known mainly for her interpretation of Baroque works, Podleś's repertoire ranges from Handel's Giulio Cesare (Cesare) to songs by Shostakovich. However, the coloratura contralto roles (some of them trouser roles) in Rossini's operas have been central to her repertoire. Critics have noted the expressive power of her voice and her ability to cope with the florid singing demanded of Rossini's heroes and heroines. Her voice has a wide range, spanning more than three octaves and has been called a "force of nature".

Her recent performances include roles of La Cieca in La Gioconda, Bertarido in Handel's Rodelinda, the title role in Rossini's Tancredi, the title role in Handel's Giulio Cesare, Isabella in Rossini's L'italiana in Algeri, Erda in Wagner's Ring Cycle (at the Seattle Opera), Klytämnestra in Richard Strauss's Elektra (with the Canadian Opera Company), Madame de la Haltière in Massenet's Cendrillon (at London's Royal Opera House), and the title role in Rossini's Ciro in Babilonia (in the work's US premiere at the Caramoor International Music Festival in July 2012 and at the Rossini Opera Festival in Pesaro, Italy, in August 2012). Podleś was scheduled to sing Azucena in Verdi's Il trovatore at the Atlanta Opera in 2009, but withdrew.

After a seemingly final run of La fille du régiment at Barcelona's Liceu in May 2017,  Podleś announced that, from 1 June, she was going to interrupt temporarily her stage career due to an upcoming orthopaedic operation, while carrying on, however, with her teaching activity. Yet, according to the singer's official website no further theatrical or concert appearances took place in subsequent years.

Podleś and her husband, the pianist , live in Warsaw.

Recordings 
Audio CD

 Airs Célèbres (Handel, Vivaldi, Purcell, Gluck, and Marcello) with 
 Chopin: Mélodies with Abdel Rahman El Bacha
 Chopin: Songs with Garrick Ohlsson
 de Falla: El amor brujo with Krzysztof Penderecki
 Duets (Mendelssohn, Brahms, Schumann) with Joanna Kozłowska and Jerzy Marchwinski (piano)
 Gluck: Armide as La Haine with Marc Minkowski
 Gluck: Orfeo ed Euridice as Orfeo with Peter Maag
 Gluck: Orphée et Eurydice as Orphée with Patrick Peire
 Handel Arias from Rinaldo and Orlando with Constantin Orbelian
 Handel: Ariodante as Polinesso with Marc Minkowski
 Mahler: Symphony No. 2: "Resurrection" with Jean-Claude Casadesus
 Mahler: Symphony No. 3 with Antoni Wit
 Mozart: Requiem with Michel Corboz and L'Ensemble vocal et instrumental de Lausanne
 Offenbach: Orphée aux enfers as L'Opinion publique
 Penderecki: Seven Gates of Jerusalem with Kazimierz Kord
 Penderecki: Te Deum and Lacrimosa
 Ewa Podleś & Garrick Ohlsson Live
 Marta Ptaszynska: Concerto for Marimba; Songs of Despair and Loneliness
 Prokofiev: Alexandr Nevsky with Jean-Claude Casadesus
 Puccini: Il trittico with Bruno Bartoletti
 Respighi: Il Tramonto with 
 Rossini Arias for Contralto with Pier Giorgio Morandi
 Rossini Gala with Wojciech Michniewski
 Rossini: Tancredi as Tancredi with Alberto Zedda
 Russian Arias with Constantin Orbelian
 Russian Melodies (Tchaikovsky, Mussorgsky, Rachmaninoff), with Graham Johnson
 A Treasury of Polish Songs with 

DVD
 Handel: Giulio Cesare in Egitto as Cornelia from Barcelona Opera
 Donizetti: La fille du régiment as Marquise de Berkenfeld
 Ponchielli: La Gioconda as La Cieca from Barcelona Opera
 Rossini: Ciro in Babilonia as Ciro from Pesaro Rossini Opera Festival
 Massenet: Cendrillon as Madame de la Haltière from Royal Opera Covent Garden
 Tchaikovsky: The Queen of Spades as the Countess from a 2011 production of the Gran Teatre del Liceu, Barcelona

References

External links 
 
 TheOperaCritic.com singer's page 
 Interview at MusicalCriticism.com
 Interview at Culture Kiosque
 Midgette, Anne (21 October 2008). "The Elemental Power of Ewa Podles". The Washington Post

1952 births
Living people
Operatic contraltos
Musicians from Warsaw
21st-century Polish women opera singers
Polish contraltos
20th-century Polish women opera singers